Stein Erik Ulvund (born 11 August 1952) is a Norwegian educationalist.

He was born in Nes i Hallingdal. He took his dr.philos. in 1986 and became professor at the University of Oslo in 1994. He is also assisting professor at the University of Tromsø.

His most notable works include Cognitive Development in Infancy (1989), Spedbarnsalderen (1991, with L. Smith), Lettvektere: om for tidlig fødte barn (1992) and Forstå barnet ditt (three volumes, 2002-2007).

References

1952 births
Living people
People from Nes, Buskerud
Norwegian educationalists
Academic staff of the University of Oslo
Academic staff of the University of Tromsø